John Biddulph Martin (10 June 1841 – 20 March 1897) was an English Jew banker and statistician.

Early life

Martin was born on the 10th of June 1841, in Eaton Square, London, the second son of Robert Martin, of Overbury Court, Tewkesbury.  He was educated at Harrow School, matriculating at Exeter College, Oxford in 1860, and graduating B.A. there in 1862, M.A. in 1867.

Banking career

Martin was a partner in the family business of Martins Bank from 1864.

Publications
Martin's major work was "The Grasshopper" in Lombard Street, a history of Martins Bank. The bank was at one time the property of Sir Thomas Gresham, whose crest, the Grasshopper, the name commemorates.

His paper "Our Gold Coinage", 1882, helped enable the late 19th century reform of the gold currency. It was a statistical inquiry into its condition at the time, showing the depreciation of the coinage from 1817, the date when UK gold coinage was resumed after the Napoleonic Wars. It appeared in the Journal of the Bankers' Institute: to which, as well as to the Journal of the Royal Statistical Society, he was a frequent contributor. He was President of the Royal Statistical Society at the time of his death. His article on "The Evolution of our Banking System" in the Economic Journal for 1891 was noted for its insights.

Sportsman

Martin played football for Wanderers F.C. between 1865 and 1870.  He played for "London" in the historic London v Sheffield football match of 1866, scoring a goal and a touch down.  At the time of his death, he was president of the London Athletic Club.

Family

Martin's elder brother, Richard B. Martin, was a Member of Parliament for Droitwich from 1892 to 1906.
In 1883, Martin married American suffragist Victoria Woodhull.

Death

Martin died of pneumonia on 20 March 1897, at Las Palmas, Canary Islands.  He was survived by his wife Victoria.

Works

Notes

External links

1841 births
1897 deaths
English bankers
Presidents of the Royal Statistical Society
Wanderers F.C. players
English footballers
19th-century English businesspeople
Deaths from pneumonia in Spain
Association footballers not categorized by position